High Voltage (Visoki napon) is a Croatian film directed by Veljko Bulajić. It was released in 1981.

External links
 
 Visoki napon at the Croatian State Archives 

1981 films
Croatian romantic drama films
1980s Croatian-language films
Yugoslav romantic drama films
Films directed by Veljko Bulajić
Films set in Zagreb
Films set in the 1940s